This is a list of airports in El Salvador, sorted by location.



List

See also 
 Transport in El Salvador
 List of airports by ICAO code: M#MS - El Salvador
 Wikipedia: WikiProject Aviation/Airline destination lists: North America#El Salvador

External links 
 Lists of airports in El Salvador:
 Great Circle Mapper
 Aircraft Charter World
 The Airport Guide
 World Aero Data
 A-Z World Airports
 FallingRain.com

 
El Salvador
Airports
Airports
El Salvador